Midland is an American country music group formed in 2014 in Dripping Springs, Texas. The band members are Mark Wystrach (lead vocals, guitar), Jess Carson (guitar, vocals), and Cameron Duddy (bass guitar, vocals). Through Big Machine Records, the band has released two EPs, their self-titled EP and The Last Resort. They have released three studio albums, On the Rocks, Let It Roll and The Last Resort: Greetings From, which have accounted for seven charted singles on the Billboard country chart: "Drinkin' Problem",  Burn Out", "Make a Little", "Mr. Lonely", "Cheatin' Songs", "Sunrise Tells the Story" and "Longneck Way to Go". Midland's musical style is neotraditional country.

History

The band Midland was formed in Dripping Springs, Texas. The trio met separately around Los Angeles, where Jess Carson and Cameron Duddy were in a number of bands through a number of years. After Carson left L.A., Duddy and Mark Wystrach met and formed a country-rock band called The Young Whiskey.  The trio met up in Jackson Hole, Wyoming, for Duddy's wedding in August 2013; both Wystrach and Carson acted as groomsmen. As Duddy recalls the story, Carson and Wystrach arrived in Jackson Hole for the wedding a week early. After playing songs together on the front porch of Carson's cabin, they proposed starting a project together. Six months later, in January 2014, Duddy called Carson and Wystrach to suggest that they record some songs, and they went to the Sonic Ranch recording studio in El Paso, TX to record for 10 days. As stated by Wystrach, "when we went to the Sonic Ranch, we became a band. We walked away believing in what had happened." Wystrach and Duddy both  moved with their families to Texas where Carson lived. They named the band after a song by musician Dwight Yoakam that was called "Fair to Midland".

Mark Wystrach grew up surrounded by music as his parents were both fans of live music. His parents owned a country music venue where he was exposed to music. He was also an actor and model.

Jess Carson grew up on a farm in Oregon where the main genre was country music. His sister and father were both musicians, so he started playing guitar.

Cameron Duddy started playing music after a difficult situation in his family; he found that music helped to lessen the tension, saying, "Sometimes you don't get to talk about all the things that you maybe want to talk about and the ice breaker started to be music." He got his first guitar from his father; it helped him to find his identity.

Duddy is also a music video director; he won an MTV Video Music Award for the video "Locked Out of Heaven" by Bruno Mars.

Midland's first song, "Fourteen Gears", was around 2015. The song, according to Duddy, was "another one of the early moments that defined and solidified the band."

2016–present
On March 9, 2016, the trio signed to Big Machine Records and released the Midland EP featuring a debut single, "Drinkin' Problem", which charted on Billboards Hot Country Songs and Country Airplay. The band wrote the song with Shane McAnally and Josh Osborne, the former of whom also produced it. Duddy directed the song's music video. Their debut album On the Rocks was released in September 22, 2017, produced by Dann Huff, Josh Osborne, Shane McAnally. Midland released "Make a Little" as the second single. "Burn Out" was the third single, it was released in late 2018.

Midland was nominated for two Grammy Awards in 2018: Grammy Award for Best Country Song and Grammy Award for Best Country Duo/Group Performance, both for "Drinkin’ Problem". Midland won at the 2018 ACM Awards for best New Vocal Group of the year. Midland released the single "Mr. Lonely" in February 2019 as the leadoff single to their second album. Midland released "Cheatin' Songs" in August of 2019 as the second single to the album. The album, Let It Roll, was released on August 23, 2019. The band began a tour in June in  support of the album. In February of 2020 Midland launched three expressions of their own brand of tequila, called "insõlito".

In March 2021, Midland released an album titled The Sonic Ranch, which served as the soundtrack for the documentary film on their origin story, focusing on their first recording session at The Sonic Ranch in 2014.  On July 16, 2021, Midland released their latest EP, The Last Resort, which hit Number 47 on the Billboard Album Sales Chart. The band followed the EP with their third studio album titled The Last Resort: Greetings From, released on May 6, 2022. They released "Sunrise Tells the Story" as the first single, and the second single was released in late 2022 titled "Longneck Way to Go", with Jon Pardi.

Band members
Mark Wystrach - lead vocals, guitar
Jess Carson - rhythm guitar, vocals
Cameron Duddy - bass guitar, vocals

Tour members
Luke Cutchen - lead guitar
Phillip Sterk - steel guitar
Robbie Crowell - drums, percussion
Jeff Adamczyk - piano, organ

 Style and influences 
Rolling Stone said that "the Texas-based band blend their voices to produce country music that recalls a mix of George Strait, Urban Cowboy and Seventies yacht rock." Billboard describes the band's sound as "a definite George Strait '80s New Traditionalist feel to it, combined with the rich California harmonies that made The Eagles legendary." Midland also is known for their unique dressing style, very similar to the original "Nudie suits" designed by Nudie Cohn. Vogue called Midland both heartthrobs and fashion risk takers."

Discography
Studio albums

Live albums

Soundtrack albums

Extended plays

SinglesNotes'

Music videos

Other appearances

Awards and nominations

References

External links
Official website

Musical groups established in 2016
Country music groups from Texas
Big Machine Records artists
2016 establishments in Texas
Musical trios